Isabel Apawo Phiri is a Malawian theologian known for her work in gender justice, HIV/AIDS, and African theology. She has been a Deputy Secretary for the World Council of Churches since 2012.

Early life and education
Phiri, a Chewa person, was born in Malawi and brought up in the Church of Central Africa Presbyterian. She has a bachelor's degree in Education from the University of Malawi, a Master's in Religious Education from the University of Lancaster in England and a PhD from the University of Cape Town in South Africa. It was in South Africa that she was first exposed to feminist theology and liberation theology. Her doctoral thesis looked at the religious experience of Chewa women in Malawi. It was re-worked into her first book, which was the first book published by a Malawian woman theologian.

Career
Phiri is a teacher by profession. She is regarded as the "mother" of the Circle of Concerned African Women Theologians in Malawi. She participated in the convocation of the Circle in 1989 and established the Circle in Malawi in 1993, with its first conference held at her home in Chirunga in 1994. She joined with three other women academics at the University of Malawi to research and write on women's issues. In 1995, she presented their research findings on sexual harassment and rape on campus at the university and was the victim of violent attacks from students and staff in response, for speaking about such a taboo topic. Her house was stoned and her office damaged. She was later threatened with excommunication from the Blantyre Synod of the Presbyterian Church of Central Africa for "inciting church women to seek gender justice." Due to these incidents, Phiri left Malawi for Namibia in 1996. Phiri was also involved in promoting the ordination of women in the Blantyre Synod, marching against the Synod's policy of barring women from ordination in 1995.

Phiri was a lecturer in the Department of Theology and Religious Studies at Chancellor College of the University of Malawi, before becoming Professor of African Theology and Dean of the School of Religion, Philosophy and Classics at the University of KwaZulu-Natal in Pietermaritzburg. She has also taught at Zomba Theological College and served as editor of the Journal of Gender and Religion in Africa. From 2002 until 2007 she was general coordinator of the Circle of Concerned African Women Theologians. She also served as moderator of the World Council of Churches' Commission on Education and Ecumenical Formation.

Phiri's research interests are in African theology, feminist theology and HIV/AIDS. She was a theological advisor for the Africa Bible Commentary, and wrote the articles on Ruth, Rape, The Bible and Polygamy, and Weddings and Lobola.

In August 2012, Phiri was appointed Associate General Secretary for Public Witness and Diakonia by the World Council of Churches. Her role focuses on issues including racism, sexuality, climate change and justice. In 2017, she presented the "Fez Plan of Action" (Plan of Action for Religious Leaders and Actors to Prevent Incitement to Violence that Could Lead to Atrocity Crimes) to the United Nations in New York, saying that more women are needed in church leadership roles to prevent future atrocity crimes.

In December 2017, Phiri was detained by Israeli authorities at Ben Gurion Airport for eight hours and refused entry to Israel for an ecumenical meeting in Jerusalem. The reason given at the time was "Prevention of illegal immigration considerations", although it was later said it was because the WCC supported Boycott, Divestment and Sanctions against Israel, although Phiri was the only one of four WCC officials refused entry. Olav Fykse Tveit, General Secretary of The World Council of Churches, released a statement calling it an "unprecedented move" and saying "The WCC deeply regrets the Israeli antagonism against the WCC's initiatives for peace with justice for both Palestinians and Israelis." In October 2018, a Jerusalem administrative appeals court invalidated the state's decision to bar Phiri entry.

In 2018, Phiri was featured in an exhibition called "Faith in Gender Justice" at the Scottish Parliament, with a photograph and her quote: "Prophetic theology has turned me into an advocate for gender justice." She has called on Christian clergy to denounce violence against women as a sin. In 2020 and 2021, Phiri has been involved in the WCC's publications on responding to the health and economic impacts of the COVID-19 pandemic and advocacy for vaccine equity.

Awards and honours
 1995, "Woman of the Year", Nation Newspaper for bringing gender justice into public debate in Malawi
 1998, Honorable mention, Noma Award for Publishing in Africa for Women, Presbyterianism and Patriarchy

Personal life
Phiri lives in Geneva, where she is an elder in the Church of Scotland. She is married to Maxwell Agabu Phiri, a professor in marketing. They co-authored a 2017 paper entitled "HIV and AIDS, Gender Violence and Masculinities: A Case of South Africa" which examined a curriculum used by church going couples, finding there had been an increase in communication about sexuality and a decrease in gender based violence, but confirming a need to re-examine the theology of marriage in African churches. They have three children.

Selected publications

Books

Journal articles

References

Living people
Year of birth missing (living people)
Chewa
Malawian Presbyterians
University of Malawi alumni
Alumni of Lancaster University
University of Cape Town alumni
Academic staff of the University of Malawi
Academic staff of the University of KwaZulu-Natal
Malawian women writers
Malawian theologians
Women Christian theologians
21st-century Protestant theologians
Christian feminist theologians
HIV/AIDS activists
People of the World Council of Churches
Elders of the Church of Scotland